The Popular may refer to:
The Popular Magazine, a former literary magazine
The Popular (department store), a former department store in El Paso, Texas

See also
 Popular (disambiguation)